James Elton Walkup (December 14, 1909 – February 7, 1997), was a professional baseball player who played pitcher in the Major Leagues from – for the  Detroit Tigers and St. Louis Browns.

He was born in Havana, Arkansas, and died in Danville, Arkansas.

External links
, or Retrosheet

1909 births
1997 deaths
Arkansas Razorbacks baseball players
Baseball players from Arkansas
Detroit Tigers players
Fort Smith Twins players
Henderson Oilers players
Little Rock Travelers players
Major League Baseball pitchers
Milwaukee Brewers (minor league) players
Muskogee Chiefs players
Paris Red Peppers players
People from Yell County, Arkansas
San Antonio Missions players
St. Louis Browns players
Toledo Mud Hens players
Toronto Maple Leafs (International League) players